Wysoka Góra , was a village in the administrative district of Gmina Krasnopol, within Sejny County, Podlaskie Voivodeship, in north-eastern Poland.

The village was founded in 1789. By the end of the 19th century its population (primarily Russian Old Believers and Polish) exceeded 200 people. It ceased to exist after the World War II due to the deportation of its inhabitants to the USSR, according to the German–Soviet Border and Commercial Agreement signed between the Soviet Union and Nazi Germany on January 10, 1941.

References

Villages in Sejny County
1789 establishments in the Polish–Lithuanian Commonwealth